Colreavy is a surname.

List of people with the surname 

 Bernard Colreavy (1871–1946), Australian cricketer
 Jack Colreavy (born 1989), Australian long distance runner
 Michael Colreavy (born 1948), Irish politician

Surnames of British Isles origin
Surnames of Irish origin